Ahmed Hussein (born 1 July 1977) is an Iraqi football midfielder who played for Iraq in the 2000 Asian Cup. He also played for Al-Zawraa.

He played for the Iraq national team between 1997 and 2000.

References

External links
 

Iraqi footballers
Iraq international footballers
2000 AFC Asian Cup players
al-Zawraa SC players
Al-Shorta SC players
Naft Al-Basra SC players
Living people
1977 births
Association football midfielders